Latta may refer to:

Places
 Port Latta, Tasmania, Australia, an iron ore port
 Latta Plantation in Huntersville, North Carolina, US
 Latta, Oklahoma, U.S.
 Latta, South Carolina, U.S.

People with the surname 
Alexander Bonner Latta (1821–1865), American manufacturer and inventor
Bob Latta (born 1956), American politician
Christopher Collins (born Christopher Latta; 1949–1994), American voice actor 
David Latta (politician) (1869–1948), Canadian politician
David Latta (ice hockey) (born 1967), Canadian ice hockey player in the National Hockey League
Del Latta (1920–2016), American politician
Frank Forrest Latta (1892–1983), American oral historian and ethnographer
Ivory Latta (born 1984), American basketball player
James P. Latta (1844–1911), American politician
John Latta (politician) (1835-1913), American politician
Sir John Latta, 1st Baronet (1867-1946), Scottish shipping magnate
Reg Latta (1897–1970), Australian rugby league footballer
Robert Latta, 1985 intruder in the White House
Thomas Latta of Leith (1796–1833), father of intravenous therapy

See also

Lotta (disambiguation)
 Lata (disambiguation)